Frank Campbell is an Irish international lawn bowls player.

Bowls career
He won a bronze medal in the men's fours at the 1982 Commonwealth Games in Brisbane with Sammy Allen, Willie Watson and John McCloughlin.

References

Male lawn bowls players from Northern Ireland
Commonwealth Games bronze medallists for Northern Ireland
Bowls players at the 1982 Commonwealth Games
Commonwealth Games medallists in lawn bowls
Medallists at the 1982 Commonwealth Games